Beccles Lido is an open-air pool at Puddingmoor, Beccles, Suffolk, on the banks of the River Waveney.

Description
The lido is 30 x 16 metres with a diving board, small slide, paddling pool and sunbathing area.

It is normally open from late May to early September. It was closed throughout 2009 but reopened August 2010 following a change of ownership and subsequent refurbishment.

History
The lido was constructed in 1959 on the site of an older bathing pool. Prior to that swimmers used a fenced off part of the River Waveney in the town.

Heating was installed in 1975.

In 2004 Waveney District Council announced plans to close the lido and to build an indoor swimming pool. In reaction to these plans, the Friends of Beccles Outdoor Pool campaign started in 2006. In 2009, Waveney District Council decided they would no longer manage the Beccles Lido (nor Halesworth Open Air Pool) after April 2009 so neither opened. Beccles Lido Limited was created and they re-opened the lido in 2010.

The chairman of Beccles Lido, Maureen Saunders, won a community pride award in July 2009 for her work campaigning for the lido and establishing the management company.

References

External links
 Beccles Lido
 Friends of Beccles Open Air Swimming Pool
 Oliver Merrington's website www.lidos.org.uk

Lidos
Buildings and structures completed in 1959
Buildings and structures in Suffolk
Beccles